Panji is a town in Panji District, Huainan, Anhui. , it administers the following seventeen villages:
Panji Village
Lixing Village
Donghu Village
Zhuzhuang Village
Huzhuang Village
Zhaoqian Village
Zhaohou Village
Xiawei Village
Dazhuang Village
Wangwei Village
Panyang Village
Jinan Village
Wuxiang Village
Zhangwei Village
Weiwei Village
Xiaowei Village
Caomiao Village

References

Panji District
Township-level divisions of Anhui